Ben Thompson (born 4 September 1973) is a former Australian rules footballer who played with St Kilda in the Australian Football League (AFL).

Thompson had a late start to his career, not beginning at Glenelg until 1996. He won their best and fairest award that year and after another season was selected by St Kilda in the 1997 National Draft, with pick 48. A defender, he made 11 appearances for St Kilda, over two seasons, then returned to Glenelg.

References

External links

1973 births
Australian rules footballers from South Australia
St Kilda Football Club players
Glenelg Football Club players
Living people